Joanna Honorata Brodzik (born 11 January 1973 in Krosno Odrzańskie, Poland) is a Polish actress. She is most famous for her roles in two TV shows: Magda M. and Kasia i Tomek.

Joanna Brodzik has won the Prize for Best Actress (ex aequo to Beata Kawka) at the Madrid Móstoles International Film Festival for the Polish production Jasne blekitne okna (The Skylights), by Bogusław Linda. Joanna Nalepka is her relative.

Her boyfriend is Paweł Wilczak, a Polish actor. In July 2008 they welcomed their first children - twins: Jan and Franciszek.

Filmography 
 1996: Dzieci i ryby 
 1996: Dzień wielkiej ryby 
 1997: Klan
 1998: Gabinet terapii ogólnej
 1998: Złoto dezerterów 
 1999: Ogniem i mieczem 
 1999: Dobra robota
 1999–2001: Graczykowie 
 2000: Gunblast vodka 
 2001: Pokrewieństwo 
 2002: Break Point
 2002: Der Pianist 
 2002–2003: Kasia i Tomek
 2004: Nigdy w życiu! 
 2004: Siedem grzechów popcooltury 
 2005–2007: Magda M. 
 2005: 1409. Afera na zamku Bartenstein
 2007: Jasne błękitne okna
 2009: Po prostu Majka
 2009: Dom nad rozlewiskiem

External links 
 
 

Polish actresses
Polish film actresses
1973 births
Living people
People from Krosno Odrzańskie
Aleksander Zelwerowicz National Academy of Dramatic Art in Warsaw alumni